Prophecy is a 1979 American science fiction monster horror-thriller film directed by John Frankenheimer and written by David Seltzer. It stars Robert Foxworth, Talia Shire and Armand Assante. Set in the Androscoggin or Ossipee River, the film follows an environmental agent and his wife filing a report on a paper mill in the river, not knowing that the paper mill's waste made a local bear mutate, causing the bear to run amok in the wilderness.

A novelization of the film, written by Seltzer as well, was also published, with the tagline "A Story of Unrelenting Terror".

Plot
While searching for lost lumberjacks in Maine, three members of a search-and-rescue team are killed by an unseen force.

In Washington D.C., Dr. Robert Verne accepts a job from the Environmental Protection Agency (EPA) to write a report about a dispute between a logging operation and a Native American tribe near the Androscoggin River or Ossipee river in Maine. Dr. Verne's wife Maggie accompanies him on the trip. She is pregnant, but is apprehensive to tell her husband as he is against having children.

In the town, the local paper mill director, Bethel Isely blames the Native Americans, dubbed Opies (short for "original people") for the missing lumberjacks and rescue team. The Opies instead blame Katahdin, a vengeful spirit of the forest that has been awakened by the activities of the loggers, which Isely describes as "larger than a dragon with the eyes of a cat". The Vernes are disturbed when they witness a confrontation between the Opies and Isley's bodyguard, Kelso, which nearly results in the death of an Opie, John Hawks.

The Vernes see several signs of environmental damage: a salmon large enough to devour a duck; a deranged, vicious raccoon; plant roots growing on the surface; and a bullfrog-sized tadpole. Hawks and his friend Ramona ask Verne to include Opie perspectives in his report. They believe the paper mill operations are somehow causing grave danger to the environment and people alike. Hector M'Rai, Ramona's grandfather, claims to have seen Katahdin and describes him as "part of everything in God's creation". Verne and Maggie tour the paper mill to look for incriminating evidence. Although Isely insists the mill has excellent safety protocols, Verne notices that Maggie's boots have mercury deposits - a mutagen that causes birth defects, it is used in logging as a fungicide and does not show up in water purity tests because it sinks to the bottom. Verne needs more evidence and determines to take blood tests from the Opies.

That night, the Nelson family, who have set up a camp in the woods, are killed by Katahdin, which appears as a large bear with one of its sides containing horribly mutated skin. Isely and Sheriff Bartholomew Pilgrim believe Hawks and the Opies are responsible and try to arrest them. However, Hawks escapes. Verne, Maggie, and Ramona take a helicopter to the campsite to investigate the killings. Verne and Ramona find huge scratch marks on the trees, while Maggie finds two mutated bear cubs, one dead and one alive, trapped in a salmon poacher's net. Forced to spend the night in the woods due to inclement weather, they nurse the cub back to health inside one of Hector's tepees. A distressed Maggie explains to Verne about her pregnancy and that she has eaten contaminated fish. Isely and Sheriff Pilgrim arrive and, upon seeing the mutant cub, accept that Hawks and his men are innocent of any crime. Katahdin arrives and attacks the camp in search of her cub. Pilgrim is killed, but the others escape through tunnels beneath Hector's home.

The next day, Isely tries to reach a nearby radio tower to call for help, but is killed by Katahdin. Later that night, she attacks the truck in which the others are driving away then decapitates Huntoon while he is strapped to a stretcher. The survivors swim across a lake towards a log cabin as Hector M'Rai gets mauled on the shore while confronting Katahdin. Verne drowns the cub when it attacks Maggie. Katahdin crosses the lake. She kills John Hawks and knocks over the cabin; which injures Ramona and knocks Maggie unconscious. Verne stabs and shoots Katahdin repeatedly, forcing her into the lake where she drowns. The next day, Verne and Maggie are seen being flown away from the forest, unaware that another mutated bear (the cubs' father) is still active within the forest.

Cast

Production

Filmed in British Columbia, Canada in 1978, this film marked the beginning of "Hollywood North", the major start to the development of a massive film production business in Vancouver and other areas within the province. Since then, hundreds of "American" movies have been filmed in the Canadian province. Scenes were also shot in Daisy Lake, Crofton, Squamish, Capilano Canyon, Britannia Bay, and Fort Langley. In California, shooting took place at the Franklin Canyon and Paramount Pictures Studios.

Some violence/gore and other scenes were deleted, not because of MPAA censors, but on a decision made by John Frankenheimer. This included a longer close-up of a man's headless corpse and a shot of Katahdin graphically disemboweling Isley (both deemed "gratuitous"), a flashback to the night where Rob and Maggie have sex (deleted for time), and extensions of several scenes, including a longer tour of the paper mill and Rob fishing, which showed him falling asleep and later waking up in the sun.

The original concept for Katahdin was considerably more terrifying than what would eventually show up on screen. However, when director John Frankenheimer saw the concept, he suggested that it should be altered to look more "bear-like". The original concept was actually quite close to the poster art.

Frankenheimer considered Prophecy a film with far more potential than what he eventually delivered.

Release

Theatrical
Prophecy was given a theatrical release in the United States by Paramount Pictures on June 15, 1979. It opened on 775 screens grossing $6,720,000 in its opening week. It grossed $22.7 million at the U.S. box office.

Home video
The film was released on Blu-ray on November 26, 2019. A previous DVD was released by Paramount Home Entertainment on January 8, 2002.

Reception
As of November 2022, review aggregator Rotten Tomatoes gave Prophecy an approval rating of 33%, based on 21 reviews, with an average rating of 4.4/10. On Metacritic, as of August 2020, the film had a weighted average score of 41 out of 100, based on four critics, indicating "mixed or average reviews".

Vincent Canby of The New York Times called the film "epically trivial" and "a feeble attempt to recycle the sort of formula movie one expects from American International Pictures." Variety called it "a frightening monster movie that people could laugh at for generations to come, complete with your basic big scary thing, cardboard characters and a story so stupid it's irresistible." Charles Champlin of the Los Angeles Times wrote that the monsters were "not particularly effective" on the screen and that the film "never approaches the chill factor of 'Alien', for example." Gary Arnold of The Washington Post called it "essentially an indoctrination course in liberal guilt, shabbily disguised as a monster melodrama. Indeed, it's such a motley monster picture that it may be lucky to attract fleeting snickers as a kind of poor man's 'Alien.'" Tim Pulleine of The Monthly Film Bulletin wrote that "once the narrative gets properly under way, the ecological sub-text virtually drops out of sight. As, even more confusingly, does the sub-plot about the heroine's pregnancy, leaving only a surfeit of creature-on-the-rampage hokum."

Richard Scheib criticized the film's monster costume, photography and lack of suspense, stating, "much of the film teeters on the brink of this unintentional absurdity and fails to emerge on the winning side. John Frankenheimer tries hard to generate tension during the scenes with the mutant bear pursuing the cast near the end, but much of the story is predictable and boring".

Cinema de Merde.com said "You don't get a lot of killing and the terror and suspense sequences really aren't that great, but it makes up for that in the sheer flamboyance of some of its touches, such as the amazing exploding sleeping bag. It's a bit of a bummer that after all the build-up, the thing turns out to be a boring old mutant bear, like ANY other mutant bear, but this is only because expectations have been raised".

Patrick Naugle from DVD Verdict wrote, "In an age of self-referential and cynical Scream horror movies and Silence of the Lambs knock offs, Prophecy has a certain something that just can't be denied. Prophecy even contains a MESSAGE (re: don't mess with Mother Nature or you'll be sorry), which is more than I can say for most horror movies produced today. Is it scary? No. Vastly amusing? You bet your bottom dollar".

Quentin Tarantino later wrote, "I kind of have a soft spot in my heart for this stupid ass movie. Aside from the bonkers bear monster, the film's one saving grace is Talia Shire."

References

External links

 
 
 
 

1979 films
1979 horror films
1970s monster movies
1970s science fiction horror films
American monster movies
American natural horror films
American science fiction horror films
Redsploitation
1970s English-language films
Films about bears
Films directed by John Frankenheimer
Films scored by Leonard Rosenman
Films set in forests
Films set in Maine
Paramount Pictures films
Films set in Washington, D.C.
Films shot in Los Angeles
Films shot in Vancouver
1970s American films